This is the list of football clubs (teams) in Taiwan.

Men

Taiwan Football Premier League (2022) 
 AC Taipei
 Hang Yuen
 Leopard Cat
 Ming Chuan University
 Taichung Futuro
 Tainan City FC
 Taiwan Power Company F.C.

Taiwan Second Division Football League (2022) 

 FC Base Athletic
 Flight Skywalkers
 Inter Taoyuan
 Kaohsiung F.C.
 Land Home NTUS F.C.
 MARS
 PlayOne
 Saturday Football International

Extinct Clubs 

 CPC Corporation F.C
 Royal Blues F
 Flying Camel
 Taipei City Bank F.C.

College teams

First division
 Nanhua University football team
 National Cheng Kung University football team
 Ming Chuan University football team
 Pingtung University of Education football team
 Taipei Physical Education College football team
 National Taiwan University football team
 National Taipei University of Technology football team
 Taiwan Physical Education college football team
 Royal Blues FC football team

Second division
Kun Shan University football team
National Cheng Kung University football team
National Chiao Tung University football team
National Taiwan University football team
National Tsing Hua University football team
Blia FC football team

Senior high school teams

The following teams have participated in Highschool Football League.
Chung Shan Industrial and Commercial School
Kaohsiung County Lu Chu Senior High School
Kaohsiung Municipal Chung Cheng Industrial Vocational High School
Kaohsiung Municipal Ruei Siang Senior High School
Ming Dao High School
National Hsin Feng Senior High School
National Hualien Senior High School
National Hualien Vocational High School of Agriculture
National Pei Men Senior High School football team
National Pingtung Senior High School
National San Chung Senior High School football team
National Shiou Shuei Industrial Vocational High School
National Yilan Senior High School football team
Neng Ren Vocational High School
Taipei High School
Taichung Municipal Hui Wen High School
Taipei County Ching Shui Senior High School
Taipei Municipal Daan Vocational High School

Share Fun Junior Soccer Club, Tainan City

Amateur

Northern Taiwan
Keelung Milvus Football Club (基隆黑鳶足球俱樂部), based in Keelung
Taipei Red Lions F.C. (台北红獅足球隊) based in Taipei
Taipei Football Club. based in Taipei
Taipei City F.C. (台北市足球隊), based in Taipei
Dong Hu Football Club (東湖足球會), based in Neihu, Taipei
Eagle Club (老鷹足球會), based in Taipei
Futbol Club de Movimiento Agresivo (MAFC) (好動足球俱樂部), based in Taipei
Nei-Hu Fire Football Club (內湖火焰隊), based in Neihu, Taipei
No Limit Soccer Team (無限足球隊), based in Taipei
Shih-Chi Soccer Club (汐止足球俱樂部), based in Xizhi District, New Taipei
Southeast Wind F.C. (東南風足球俱樂部), based in Tucheng District, New Taipei
Taiwan Celts G.A.A. Club, based in Taipei
Shongshan F.C., based in Taipei
 Da'an F.C. based in Taipei
Mighty Shane F.C., based in Taipei
Rogue F.C., now becomes Royal Blues F.C., based in Taipei
Celts F.C., based in Taipei
Riverside Magpies F.C., based in Taipei
Master Football Academy / 明星足球; football for children to adults, based in Taipei
Ontap Badgers, based in Taipei
Saturday Football International (SFI) - 週六足球俱樂部; Football Club & Academy Program, based in Taipei
Inter Taipei F.C., Football Club & Academy Program, based in Taipei
http://www.soccerkid.url.tw Dream football club 夢幻國際足球隊 新竹

Central Taiwan
Tiger Green Soccer Team (虎青足球隊), based in Yunlin
Taichung Compass Football Club, based in Taichung
Jhubei Football Club, based in Hsinchu
 Tubbies football club, based in Taichung

Southern Taiwan
Kaohsiung 100 Pacers FC, based in Kaohsiung
Kaohsiung Massive Football Club, based in Kaohsiung
Tainan Phoenix(台南鳳凰足球會), based in Tainan
Thunderbird F.C., based in Kaohsiung
Share Fun Bilingual Academy, Tainan City, Share Fun Royal King Soccer Club
 Share Fun Kindergarten, Tainan City, Share Fun Kingdom Football Team

Eastern Taiwan

 
Taiwan
Football clubs
Football clubs